The discography of B*Witched, an Irish pop girl group, consists of two studio albums, two extended plays, two compilation albums, two video albums and 13 singles (including one as part of a collective). The group released their debut single "C'est la Vie" on 25 May 1998. Despite mixed reviews, it reached Number 1 on the UK charts, making them the youngest female group ever to do so, and also made Number 9 in the US. Subsequent singles "Rollercoaster", "To You I Belong" and "Blame It on the Weatherman" also topped the UK charts. The group's debut album, B*Witched, was released in October 1998, reaching Number 3 in the UK charts and was certified Double Platinum in the UK and Platinum in the US. B*Witched's second album, Awake and Breathe, released almost exactly a year after their debut, peaked at number 5 on the charts and was certified Platinum. Singles from the album were less successful than earlier releases ("Jesse Hold On" reached number 4, "I Shall Be There" number 13 and "Jump Down" number 16 in the UK). The latter two appeared on their new American EP, Across America 2000, along with live tracks and the earlier cover of "Does Your Mother Know". However, in September 2002, the group officially split when O'Carroll decided to leave the band.

On 18 October 2012, it was announced that B*Witched would reunite for the ITV2 reality documentary series The Big Reunion. In May 2013 B*Witched unveiled a new song called "Love and Money". During a radio interview in October 2013, Edele Lynch confirmed that the group would release new material in September 2014. In December, they announced via PledgeMusic that they had recorded their first ever EP, entitled Champagne or Guinness. It was released on 28 September 2014 alongside the single "The Stars Are Ours".

Albums

Studio albums

Compilations

Video albums

Extended plays

Singles

As main artist

As featured artist

Other appearances

Music videos

References

Discographies of Irish artists
Pop music group discographies
Discography